The Chhota Udaipur–Dhar line is a railway line under construction from Chhota Udaipur railway station to Dhar railway station. It is a part of Western Railway zone of Indian Railways.

This corridor passes through the ranges of Chhota Udaipur Hills in Gujarat and Sondwara Plateau in Madhya Pradesh. It will play an important role in directly connecting Vadodara and Indore and also it's a joint project of Indore–Dahod line. It will put Dhar first time on the railway line. This was demanded over decades by the residents of Nimar region as well as Central Gujarat.

It's also an important tourism destination by rail after connecting with Alirajpur and Dhar. Where Alirajpur is famous for wood carvings and mango farms, Dhar is famous for historical tourist destinations.

Main line sections
This line is divided into two sections:

Stations

Projects
In 2014, Prime Minister's office has given clearance to this line and report was forwarded to Ministry of Railway. As a report of the line was sent to railway ministry for the railway line from Khandwa to Dhar via Khargone and Barwani by Government of Madhya Pradesh and was against considered for 2008-09 railway budget for survey. This railway line will be laid on 157-km Chhota Udaipur-Dhar rail line was that to be built at a cost .

Currently, the first section of this line was opened on 30 October 2019 and a passenger train on this route also started running. and also the second section of this line is under construction.

References

External links 
 Official site

5 ft 6 in gauge railways in India
Proposed
Rail transport in Madhya Pradesh
Railway lines in Gujarat
Western Railway zone